Gyrodactylus elegans is a species of monogenean parasitic flatworms in the family Gyrodactylidae.

It is reported parasiting the golden shiner (Notemigonus crysoleucas) in the wild as well as the goldfish (Carassius auratus) in aquaria.

References 

 Ueber die Entwicklung von Gyrodactylus elegans v. Nrdm. L Kathariner, 1904

elegans
Animals described in 1832